Jessica Alonso Bernardo (born 20 September 1983 in Gijón) is a former Spanish handball player, who was of the Spanish women's national team.

She was part of the  Spanish team at the 2008 European Women's Handball Championship, where the Spanish team reached the final, after defeating Germany in the semifinal.  She was also part of the bronze medal-winning Spanish teams at the 2011 World Championships (the first world championship medal for the Spanish women's team) and the 2012 Olympics.

References

1983 births
Living people
Sportspeople from Gijón
Spanish female handball players
Olympic medalists in handball
Olympic handball players of Spain
Handball players at the 2012 Summer Olympics
Olympic bronze medalists for Spain
Medalists at the 2012 Summer Olympics
Expatriate handball players
Spanish expatriate sportspeople in Serbia
Spanish expatriate sportspeople in France
Mediterranean Games competitors for Spain
Competitors at the 2009 Mediterranean Games
21st-century Spanish women